"Black Betty" (Roud 11668) is a 20th-century African-American work song often credited to Huddie "Lead Belly" Ledbetter as the author, though the earliest recordings are not by him. Some sources claim it is one of Lead Belly's many adaptations of earlier folk material.

There are numerous recorded versions, including a cappella and folk. The song was eventually, with modified lyrics, remade as a rock song by the American band Ram Jam in 1977. Subsequent recordings, including hits by Tom Jones and Spiderbait, retain the structure of this version.

Meaning and origin
The origin and meaning of the lyrics are subject to debate. Historically, the "Black Betty" of the title may refer to the nickname given to a number of objects: a bottle of whiskey, a whip, or a penitentiary transfer wagon.

David Hackett Fischer, in his book Albion's Seed: Four British Folkways in America (Oxford University Press, 1989), states that "Black Betty" was a common term for a bottle of whisky in the borderlands between northern England and southern Scotland; it later became a euphemism in the backcountry areas of the eastern United States. In January 1736, Benjamin Franklin published The Drinker's Dictionary in the Pennsylvania Gazette offering 228 round-about phrases for being drunk.  One of those phrases is "He's kiss'd black Betty." Other sources give the meaning of "Black Betty" in the United States (from at least 1827) as a liquor bottle.

In Caldwells's Illustrated Combination Centennial Atlas of Washington Co. Pennsylvania of 1876, a short section describes wedding ceremonies and marriage customs, including a wedding tradition where two young men from the bridegroom procession were challenged to run for a bottle of whiskey. This challenge was usually given when the bridegroom party was about a mile from the destination-home where the ceremony was to be had. Upon securing the prize, referred to as "Black Betty", the winner of the race would bring the bottle back to the bridegroom and his party. The whiskey was offered to the bridegroom first and then successively to each of the groom's friends.

John A. and Alan Lomax's 1934 book, American Ballads and Folk Songs describes the origins of "Black Betty":

John Lomax also interviewed blues musician James Baker (better known as "Iron Head") in 1934, almost one year after Iron Head performed the first known recorded performance of the song. In the resulting article for Musical Quarterly, titled "'Sinful Songs' of the Southern Negro", Lomax again mentions the nickname of the bullwhip is "Black Betty". Steven Cornelius in his book, Music of the Civil War Era, states in a section concerning folk music following the war's end that "prisoners sang of 'Black Betty', the driver's whip."

In an interview conducted by Alan Lomax with former Texas penal farm prisoner Doc "Big Head" Reese, Reese stated that the term "Black Betty" was used by prisoners to refer to the "Black Maria" — the penitentiary transfer wagon.

Robert Vells, in Life Flows On in Endless Song: Folk Songs and American History, writes:

In later versions, "Black Betty" was depicted as various vehicles, including a motorcycle and a hot rod.

Early recordings (1933–1939) 

The song was first recorded in the field by US musicologists John and Alan Lomax in December 1933, performed a cappella by the convict James "Iron Head" Baker and a group at Central State Farm, Sugar Land, Texas (a State prison farm). Baker was 63 years old at the time of the recording.

The Lomaxes were recording for the Library of Congress and later field recordings in 1934, 1936, and 1939 also include versions of "Black Betty". A notated version was published in 1934 in the Lomaxes book American Ballads and Folk Songs. It was recorded commercially in New York in April 1939 for the Musicraft Records label by Lead Belly, as part of a medley with two other work songs: "Looky Looky Yonder" and "Yellow Woman's Doorbells". Musicraft issued the recording in 1939 as part of a 78-rpm five-disc album entitled Negro Sinful Songs sung by Lead Belly. Lead Belly had a long association with the Lomaxes, and had himself served time in State prison farms. Lead Belly was first recorded by the Lomaxes in 1933 when he was approximately 44 years old. John Lomax helped Lead Belly get the recording contract with Musicraft in 1939.

Post-1939
While Lead Belly's 1939 recording was also performed a cappella (with hand claps in place of hammer blows), most subsequent versions added guitar accompaniment. These include folk-style recordings in 1964 by Odetta (as a medley with "Looky Yonder", with staccato guitar strums in place of hand claps), and Alan Lomax himself.

Singer Dave Ray of the folk-blues trio Koerner, Ray and Glover also recorded the song unaccompanied on their 1964 album Lots More Blues, Rags and Hollers.

In 1968, Manfred Mann released a version of the song, arranged for a band, on their LP Mighty Garvey!, with the title and lyrics changed to "Big Betty". In 1972, Manfred Mann's Earth Band performed "Black Betty" live for John Peel's In Concert on the BBC, this version was released in 2019 on the double CD / triple LP Radio Days Volume 4, which also contains an earlier rendition from 1971 under the title "Big Betty". The same musical arrangement but with a new lyric and altered vocal melody appeared on the Earth Band's second album Glorified Magnified as "Look Around", credited solely to drummer Chris Slade. A studio version of "Big Betty" was recorded at the same sessions but remained unreleased until the 40th Anniversary box set in 2011.

Ram Jam version

Bill Bartlett had been in the Lemon Pipers and then formed a group called Starstruck. While in Starstruck, Bartlett took Lead Belly's 59-second long "Black Betty" and arranged, recorded and released it on the group's own TruckStar label. "Black Betty" became a regional hit. Producers Jerry Kasenetz and Jeffry Katz in New York formed a group around Bartlett called Ram Jam. They re-released the song, and it became a hit nationally. The Ram Jam version was actually the same one originally recorded by Starstruck (albeit significantly edited to rearrange the song structure). The song became an instant hit with listeners, and reached number 18 on the singles charts in the United States and achieved more success in the UK and Australia reaching the top ten.

Both the Ram Jam and the Spiderbait versions appear in the 2005 film The Dukes of Hazzard, with the Ram Jam version also appearing on the soundtrack album.

Figure skating world champion Javier Fernández performed his short program to Ram Jam's version of "Black Betty" during the 2014–15 season, when he won his third European Championships title and his first World Championships gold medal. The level Castle Rock from the 2013 video game Rayman Legends is based on Ram Jam's version of "Black Betty".

The song was remixed by Dutch DJ Ben Liebrand in 1989 as Rough 'n' Ready Remix and became successful, reaching number 13 in the UK as well as charting in several other countries.

It appeared twice in the season twenty episode of Family Guy, "Cootie & The Blowhard".

The song was used in the movie Kung Pow! Enter the Fist, during a fight between the hero and a villain who called himself Master Betty.

Formats and track listings 
7-inch (1977)

 "Black Betty" – 2:32
 "I Should Have Known" – 4:45

7-inch (1989)

 "Black Betty" (Rough 'n' Ready Remix – Edit) – 3:12
 "Black Betty" (Original Version) – 3:56

12-inch (1989)

 "Black Betty" (Rough 'n' Ready Remix) – 5:28
 "Black Betty" (Original Version) – 3:56
 "Black Betty" (Rough 'n' Ready Remix – Edit) – 3:12

CD (1989)

 "Black Betty" (Rough 'n' Ready Remix – Edit) – 3:12
 "Black Betty" (Original Version) – 3:56
 "Black Betty" (Rough 'n' Ready Remix) – 5:28

CD (1989)

 "Black Betty" – 2:29
 "Let It All Out" – 4:00
 "High Steppin'" – 3:41
 "Hey Boogie Woman" – 3:09

12-inch (France, 1994)

 "Black Betty" (Rough 'n' Ready Remix) – 5:28
 "Black Betty" (Rough 'n' Ready Remix – Edit) – 3:12
 "Black Betty" (Version Courte) – 2:32
 "Black Betty" (Version Album) – 3:57
 "Black Betty" (Rough 'n' Ready Remix) – 5:28
 "Black Betty" (Rough 'n' Ready Remix – Edit) – 3:12
 "Black Betty" (Version Courte) – 2:32
 "Black Betty" (Version Album) – 3:57

CD (France, 1994)

 "Black Betty" (Rough 'n' Ready Remix) – 5:28
 "Black Betty" (Rough 'n' Ready Remix – Edit) – 3:12
 "Black Betty" (Version Courte) – 2:32
 "Black Betty" (Version Album) – 3:57

CD (France, 1994)

 "Black Betty" (Version Courte) – 2:32
 "Black Betty" (Version Album) – 3:57

Charts

Weekly charts

Year-end charts

Certifications

Spiderbait version

In 2004, Australian alternative rock band Spiderbait released a version of "Black Betty" as the lead single from their sixth studio album, Tonight Alright, on March 15. Produced by Sylvia Massy, this version is a slightly faster re-working of Ram Jam's hard rock arrangement. The song was a hit in Australia, reaching number one on the ARIA Singles Chart in May 2004, becoming Spiderbait's first number-one single in Australia. The song was released as Spiderbait's debut single in the United States on October 18, 2004, reaching number 32 on Billboard's Mainstream Rock Songs chart in November of the same year.

At the ARIA Music Awards of 2004, the song was nominated for Highest Selling Single and Best Video. Despite the song's success, Spiderbait's drummer, Kram, has considered their version of "Black Betty" a "fluke", as he wanted to perform three drum solos on the recording but was outvoted by the other band members.

Track listing

Charts

Weekly charts

Year end charts

Decade-end charts

Certifications

Release history

UNH controversy 
In 2006, the University of New Hampshire administration controversially banned the playing of Ram Jam's "Black Betty" at UNH hockey games. UNH Athletic Director Marty Scarano explained the reason for the decision: "UNH is not going to stand for something that insults any segment of society". In 2006 UNH students started the "Save Black Betty" campaign. Students protested at the hockey games by singing Ram Jam's "Black Betty", wearing T-shirts with writing on the front "Save Black Betty" and writing on the back "Bam-A-Lam", and holding up campaign posters at the game. The Ram Jam version was again played once at a UNH–UMaine hockey game on January 24, 2013, after a seven-year hiatus.

Selected list of recorded versions
 1933 James Baker (AKA Iron Head) and group
 1939 Mose Platt (AKA Clear Rock)
 1939 Huddie Ledbetter (AKA Lead Belly), originally on the 78rpm album Negro Sinful Songs
 1964 Odetta, as "Looky Yonder" on the album Odetta Sings of Many Things
 1964 Alan Lomax, Texas Folk Songs album
 1968 Manfred Mann, as "Big Betty" on the Mighty Garvey! album
 2002 Tom Jones UK #50 single, also on the UK #36 album Mr. Tom Jones
2008 Black Keys

See also
 Roud Folk Song Index
 List of 1970s one-hit wonders in the United States

References

Bibliography
 Collins, Lewis. Historical Sketches of Kentucky. Cincinnati: James & Co. (1848).
 Thornton, Richard H. (ed.). An American Glossary. Philadelphia: J.B. Lippincott Company (1912).

External links
 
 SecondHandSongs: List of cover versions

Year of song unknown
1977 singles
2001 singles
2004 singles
American folk songs
Epic Records singles
Interscope Records singles
Lead Belly songs
Number-one singles in Australia
Obscenity controversies in music
Ram Jam songs
Spiderbait songs
Universal Music Australia singles